Elachista melina is a moth of the family Elachistidae that is endemic to  Australia.

References

Moths described in 2011
melina
Endemic fauna of Australia
Moths of Australia